Kathleen Beller (born February 19, 1956) is an American actress who was nominated for a Golden Globe Award for Best Motion Picture Actress in a Supporting Role for her role in Promises in the Dark (1979) and was well known for her role as Kirby Anders on the prime time soap opera Dynasty. She had a small role in The Godfather Part II and a featured role in The Betsy.

Career 
Beller started her career by appearing in several commercials. She debuted on television in 1971, taking over the role of Liza Walton Sentell in the daytime soap opera Search for Tomorrow, which was originated by Denise Nickerson. She appeared on the show until 1974 when she quit to move from New York City to Los Angeles. After arriving, Don Most arranged for her to get an agent. Her film debut was a small role in 1974's The Godfather Part II, portraying an actress in a play that the young Vito Corleone and Genco Abbandando attended. Later, she was recognized more for her television work, appearing in TV movies and guest-starring in television series, notably the soap Dynasty. She played Betsy in 1978's The Betsy, a role Beller hoped would end her television career and start her film career:

Despite the optimism, the film was panned and did not advance Beller's career. She blamed the role, which she said could have been played by anyone. Beller returned to television work, appearing in TV movies such as Mary White (1977) and Are You in the House Alone? (1978). She recalled the exhausting casting procedure of Mary White, which lasted daily for three weeks. Beller also continued to appear in films, playing a supporting role in the 1978 musical comedy Movie Movie, and portraying a cancer patient in the film Promises in the Dark (1979). She spent three months researching the Promises in the Dark role, and later recalled it as one of her favorite roles. Although the film was a commercial failure, the role earned Beller a Golden Globe nomination.

In 1981, Beller co-starred in the psychological thriller No Place to Hide, her first adult role. Her character initially was going to be a teenager, but Beller insisted on playing someone more mature. Although she assumed this demand would cause her not to be cast, she won the role, which the film's director changed to a woman in her early 20s. In an interview to promote the film, Beller admitted that, although she was 25 years old at the time, she still had trouble convincing people that she was older than 16. The following year, she played the female lead in the fantasy film The Sword and the Sorcerer (1982). The film was a commercial success, grossing $39 million on a $4 million budget, but Beller later commented that she was dissatisfied with the film. In 1982 Beller starred in the Civil War miniseries The Blue and the Gray, in which she played Kathy Reynolds, a senator's daughter.

Beller perhaps is best remembered for her role from 1982 to 1984 as Kirby Anders Colby in the prime time television soap opera Dynasty. She blamed her departure from Dynasty on the new writers who were hired in 1984, explaining that they had "lost interest in her character and that when her contract ended, they decided not to renew it". Beller said that "[she'd] come back if they wanted [her]". She reprised the role for Dynasty: The Reunion in 1991.

After her run on Dynasty, Beller starred in the TV thriller Deadly Messages, which Beller said differed from her earlier thrillers by "[not taking] itself too seriously". In an interview, she explained her tendency to portray victims in films is encouraged by "the color and size of [her] big brown eyes", "the way [she interprets] roles" and "the episodic roles [she] did while [she] was growing up". Her casting in the film was an unusual one: According to the actress, she received a call from her agent about a script, read it immediately, and drove to the studio an hour later, expecting a meeting. When she arrived, however, she was asked if she could start working right away. She took the role because of "the whirlwind casting", and the fact that she had not worked for seven months, since a guest spot on Glitter.

Beller also played Mary Caitlin Callahan on the short-lived school drama The Bronx Zoo.

Personal life
Beller studied drama at age 13 in Bristol, England. In the mid-1980s, Beller announced she wanted to become a midwife, and told a reporter that she had "attended eight births so far".

Beller was married to actor Michael Hoit from 1980 to 1986. She married musician Thomas Dolby in 1988. They have three children.

Filmography

Film

Television

Awards and nominations

References

External links
 
 

American film actresses
American television actresses
Actresses from New York (state)
1956 births
Living people
People from Westchester County, New York
20th-century American actresses
21st-century American women